Lifeline is a documentary television program broadcast on the NBC television network between September 1978 and early 1979. It documented the daily routines of some of the most successful doctors of the time.

External links 
 

1978 American television series debuts
1979 American television series endings
NBC original programming
1970s American documentary television series